SouthLake Christian Academy is a co-educational, private day school in the Lake Norman area north of Charlotte, North Carolina.  SouthLake draws students from suburban areas across six counties.  Celebrating the 25th year of its founding, the campus has grown to 30 acres and now houses educational facilities for Lower, Middle, and Upper Schools serving grades Junior Kindergarten through 12th.

SouthLake Christian Academy holds accreditations and memberships with the Southern Association of Colleges and Schools Council on Accreditation and School Improvement (SACS-CASI), the Associatation of Christian Schools International (ACSI), the National Association for College Admissions Counseling (NACAC), the Southern Association for College Admissions Counseling (SACAC), Cognia (formly known as AdvancED), and the Evangelical Council for Financial Accountability (ECFA).

SouthLake Christian Academy's administrative team includes Head of School, Dr. Matthew Kerlin (serving since 2018), Upper School Principal, Becky Makla (serving since 2020), Middle School Principal, Jennifer Thomas (serving since 2021) Lower School Principal, Mark Apgar (serving since 2004), and Director of College and Career Counseling, Karen Woodruff (serving since 2003).

SouthLake Christian Academy currently serves 620 students in grades Junior Kindergarten through 12th.  Tuition ranges from $8,950.00 to $13,450.00.  Approximately 20% of students receive financial assistance.

SouthLake Christian is located in the Lake Norman area north of Charlotte in Huntersville, North Carolina. The campus houses educational facilities for Lower, Middle, and Upper School students.  SouthLake's First Building serves as home for many enrichment classes, including foreign languages, art, and music.  The Field House provides a weight room, home and away locker rooms, a trainer's room, and a concession area. Wilcox Center is home to the Wilcox Gym, library, and computer lab.  Hampton Hall houses a newly designed STEAM lab for students in grades Junior Kindergarten through 4th.

On July 28, 2016 former SouthLake Christian Academy headmaster, Wayne Parker, pleaded guilty to stealing 9 million dollars from the school. Mr. Parker was sentenced to 5 years in prison on November 30 of the same year.   The following December, former pastor of the associated church and founder of the school, Wade Malloy, pleaded guilty to wire fraud for helping Parker steal the money.  Malloy was sentenced and has served time.  Since 2015 SouthLake Christian Academy has successfully undergone 4 audits conducted by an outside accounting firm.  SouthLake Christian Academy is certified by the Evangelical Council for Financial Accountability (ECFA).

Arts 
SouthLake Christian Academy offers a comprehensive Fine Arts curriculum.  Students are given the opportunity to study and participate in both the visual and performing arts.  Fine Art classes include Art Foundations, Chapel Band, Graphic Design, Theater, and more.  Students have the opportunity to participate in the ACSI Art Festival, ACSI Creative Writing Festival, as well as local and school concerts and art exhibitions.  High School drama productions have included The Wizard of Oz, Disney's The Little Mermaid, and 2019's production of Shrek.

Athletics 
SouthLake offers middle and high school students the opportunity to compete in 14 different sports on 35 competitive teams. SouthLake teams have enjoyed success by winning 5 team NCISAA championships and 20 individual NCISAA championships in baseball, cross country, football, swimming, volleyball and wrestling.  SouthLake teams include baseball, basketball, cheerleading, cross country, football, golf, lacrosse, soccer, softball, swimming, tennis, track and field, volleyball, and wrestling.

Notable alumni
Will Grier - NFL quarterback, he transferred after his sophomore season

References

External links
Official website

Schools in Charlotte, North Carolina